Camboglanna (with the modern name of Castlesteads) was a Roman fort. It was the twelfth fort on Hadrian's Wall counting from the east, between Banna (Birdoswald) to the east and Uxelodunum (Stanwix) to the west. It guarded an important approach to the Wall and also watched the east bank of the Cambeck against raiders from the Bewcastle area. The site was drastically levelled in 1791 when the gardens of Castlesteads House were laid over it. The name "Camboglanna" is believed to mean "Crook Bank", or "Bent Valley" because it overlooks a bend in the river Irthing; the name is Brythonic, made of cambo- "curved, bent, crooked" and glanna "steep bank, stream/river side, valley with a stream".

There was some confusion over the Roman name for the fort. At one time Camboglanna was the accepted name for Birdoswald, but this is now believed to be an error in the Notitia Dignitatum. The Roman name for Birdoswald is now thought to be Banna.

Description
It faces roughly north-west by south-east and overlooks the gorge of the Cambeck. Erosion of the gorge has destroyed the north-west face of the fort.

The fort lies within the Vallum, but is not adjacent to the Wall. It is the only fort on Hadrian's Wall in this position. It appears that the Wall had already been built at the most convenient point to cross the Cambeck and so, when the fort was built, the strongest point was chosen rather than one adjacent to the Wall.

Garrison
The 2nd-century garrison was the First Cohort of Batavians, followed by Cohors IV Gallorum equitata. The 3rd-century garrison was the Cohors II Tungrorum, part-mounted.

Excavations
In 1934 the fort was partly excavated and the walls, apart from the missing north-east wall, were uncovered. The north-east and south-west double gates, and the tower at the southern corner were also uncovered. It was also established that the fort was defended by a single ditch. Several altars have been found at the site and have been preserved.

Previously, in 1741, an external bath-house was located and partly dug by Susanna Appleby, a local antiquarian.

References

 J. Collingwood Bruce, Roman Wall (1863), Harold Hill & Son, 
 Frank Graham, The Roman Wall, Comprehensive History and Guide (1979), Frank Graham,

External links
Castlesteads (Camboglanna) at www.Roman-Britain.co.uk

Forts of Hadrian's Wall
Roman fortifications in England
Roman sites in Cumbria